The Party of the Nation's Retirees (PAN) was a Brazilian political party founded on November 22, 1995. The alleged objective of the PAN was to protect the interests of the Brazilian retired men.

The PAN was legally recognized as a political party by Brazilian Electoral Superior Court on February 19, 1998.

As of October 2007, the party had 47,103 members.

In October 2007 it was incorporated into the Brazilian Labour Party.

References

1995 establishments in Brazil
2006 disestablishments in Brazil
Defunct political parties in Brazil
Pensioners' parties
Political parties disestablished in 2006
Political parties established in 1995